Marmesin (nodakenetin) is a chemical compound precursor in psoralen and linear furanocoumarins biosynthesis.

Marmesin plays a central role in the biosynthesis of furocoumarins in the plant ruta graveolens, more commonly known as rue. It acts as the natural intermediate in the formation of the furan ring that leads to a 4’,5’-dihydro furocoumarin-derivative. This substance can then be transformed into psoralen and other furocoumarins present in rue. Upon feeding the herb a dose of marmesin, radioactivity became strongly incorporated into psoralen and thus the plant itself.

Spectra

IR Spectra 
IR (ATR): νmax 3480, 2971, 1699, 1631, 1488 cm-1.

Proton-NMR 
1H-NMR (300 MHz, CDCl3): δ 7.59 (d, J = 9.5 Hz, 1H, aromatic), 7.22 (s, 1H, aromatic), 6.75 (d, J = 21.6 Hz, 1H, aromatic), 6.20 (d, J = 9.5 Hz, 1H, aromatic), 4.74 (t, J = 8.8 Hz, 1H, CH), 3.28-3.15 (m, 2H, CH2), 1.87 (s, 1H, OH), 1.37 (s, 3H, CH3), 1.24 (s, 3H, CH3) ppm.

UV-Vis 
UV: [neutral]λmax  217 (ε7420); 338 (ε17700)( MeOH)   [neutral]λmax  332( EtOH).

Production 
Synthesis of marmesin has been successfully conducted in the laboratory on multiple occasions. One way of doing so is by a strategy based on the palladium-catalyzed intramolecular coupling reaction. This reaction would construct the dihydropyran ring and synthesize the compound from the intermediate (-)-peucedanol. The key step in the overall synthesis uses catalytic asymmetric epoxidation of an enone.

References

External links

Furanocoumarins
Terpeno-phenolic compounds